Houghton University is a private Christian liberal arts college in Houghton, New York. Houghton was founded in 1883 by Willard J. Houghton and is affiliated with the Wesleyan Church. Houghton serves roughly 1000 students and has 54 degree majors for primarily undergraduate students.

History
Houghton University began in 1883 as Houghton Seminary, a coeducational high school founded by Willard J. Houghton, a Wesleyan Methodist minister. In 1899, the first few college classes were offered. James S. Luckey was appointed president in 1908 and Houghton College received its provisional charter from New York in 1923. A permanent charter was granted in 1927, and accreditation by the Middle States Association of Colleges and Schools came in 1935. Stephen Paine was appointed president in 1937.  When the former Buffalo Bible Institute merged with Houghton College in 1969, the West Seneca campus was created. Wilber Dayton was appointed president in 1972 and he was succeeded by Daniel R. Chamberlain in 1976. The university initiated its first master’s degree program in 2004 and currently offers nine such degrees.  Shirley Mullen was appointed president in 2006. From 2012 to 2013, the university set new records of giving to the institution for two years in a row. Despite this, Houghton University faced financial and enrollment challenges which led to academic budget cuts for the 2014–2015 academic year. This led to a "strategic reallocation of resources" which led to the development of several new majors including Music Industry, Sports Management, and Data Science. Houghton was approved to become a university in July 2022.

Campus
A new Adult Education program offers a B.S. in Management at a variety of locations. Houghton University opened two locations in Niagara County for their Adult Education Program in 2013, in the city of Niagara Falls, N.Y., and in Lockport, N.Y.

Academics
Houghton University grants associate and bachelor's degrees in 46 majors. The university also offers six graduate degrees through the Greatbatch School of Music.

Rankings
Houghton University is ranked tied for #124 in National Liberal Arts Colleges in the 2020 Best Colleges rankings by U S News & World Report.

First Year Honors
A distinctive First Year Honors Program is for qualified first-year students.  There are two options: London Honors, and Science Honors. Previously the university offered a Contemporary Contexts program, but was replaced by London Honors in 2014. During London Honors, students spend their spring semester in London studying the development of the western world. East Meets West involves taking integrated classes during normal semester then traveling abroad during "May Term", exploring the roots of Western culture. Science Honors takes place during both first-year semesters at Houghton, involving research in recent real-world issues such as fuel-efficiency, climate change, and energy sources. The theme for 2012-13 was Global Warming and ways in which to improve Houghton's efforts in environmentalism.  As part of this commitment, the school has built one of the largest solar arrays in the state of New York, with a ribbon cutting ceremony on April 17, 2015.

Student life
There are four traditional residence halls and four townhouses residences. Two of the traditional residence halls, Gillette Hall and Lambein Hall, are female residences. Rothenbuhler Hall and Shenawana Hall are male residences. Sophomore, Junior and senior students have the option to live in the townhouses. Houghton University is a distinctly residential campus but does allow for upper class students the opportunity to apply to live in approved off-campus housing, called Community Living Opportunities (CLOs). Many organizations and clubs are available for students to join or found their own.

Athletics

The Houghton athletic teams are called the Highlanders. The university is a member of the Division III level of the National Collegiate Athletics Association (NCAA), primarily competing in the Empire 8 Athletic Conference (a.k.a. Empire 8) since the 2012–13 academic year. The Highlanders previously competed in the defunct American Mideast Conference of the National Association of Intercollegiate Athletics (NAIA) from 2001–02 to 2011–12.

Houghton competes in 16 intercollegiate varsity sports: Men's sports include baseball, basketball, cross country, soccer and track & field (indoor and outdoor); while women's sports include basketball, cross country, field hockey, soccer, softball, tennis, track & field (indoor and outdoor) and volleyball.

Accomplishments
Houghton's first national champion was Kaitlin Fadden who won the 2008 NAIA Outdoor Track and Field marathon event in a time of 2:57:10.  It was the first NAIA national championship, either for a team or individual, for Houghton College.

May 2012 graduate Danielle Brenon was the NAIA Outdoor Track and Field national champion in the marathon.

In 2014, the University opened the Kerr-Pegula Athletic Complex thanks to a $12 million gift from 1991 graduate Kim Pegula. The complex is named after Kim's father Ralph Kerr, an instructor in Houghton's Adult Education program, and her husband Terrence Pegula. Three lighted turf facilities are home to the Houghton Highlander soccer, baseball, softball, field hockey, and outdoor track. The multipurpose field house includes an eight-lane, 200-meter track and six tennis courts, offering a competition venue for the indoor track and tennis programs. It also provides dedicated practice space for outdoor sports over the winter and during inclement weather and also serve as a hub of involvement for the campus and the surrounding communities of Northern Allegany County and Western New York.

Club and intramural sports
The University also offers club and intramural sports for men and women, including flag football, soccer, volleyball, basketball, and indoor soccer. Co-ed club and intramural sports are handball, water polo, and volleyball. Co-ed ultimate frisbee is also a popular sport. Club disc golf was added in 2021, and the University features two on-campus 18-hole disc golf courses.

Notable alumni
 Robert Beckford, a British academic theologian and a professor of Theology and Culture in the African Diaspora at Canterbury Christ Church University,
 Deborah L. Birx, United States Global AIDS Coordinator and Ambassador-at-Large
 Ira S. Bowen, astronomer, director of Mt Wilson and Palomar Observatories 1946-1964
 Douglas Comer, Professor of Computer Science at Purdue University
 Ronald Enroth, evangelical Christian author
 Victor P. Hamilton, Theologian and biblical scholar. Professor Emeritus of Old Testament at Asbury University. 
Rachel Boone Keith, Liberian-born physician in Detroit 
 Neil MacBride, Vice President of Anti-Piracy and General Counsel of the Business Software Alliance, formerly Chief Counsel on the Senate Judiciary Committee and Assistant U.S. Attorney in the Criminal Division of the U.S. Department of Justice.
 Dr. Richard J. Mouw, president of Fuller Theological Seminary for twenty years, 1993-2013
 Kim Pegula, co-owner of the Buffalo Bills and President/CEO of Pegula Sports and Entertainment
 George Beverly Shea, Dove Award-winning musician with the Billy Graham Crusade
 William A. Smalley, linguist
 Nora Lawrence Smith, newspaper publisher
 Bruce Waltke, professor at Reformed Theological Seminary
 Ralph F. Young, historian at Temple University

References

External links
 Official website
 Official athletics website

 
1883 establishments in New York (state)
Council for Christian Colleges and Universities
Education in Buffalo, New York
Educational institutions established in 1883
Evangelicalism in New York (state)
Liberal arts colleges in New York (state)
Universities and colleges affiliated with the Wesleyan Church
Universities and colleges in Allegany County, New York
Private universities and colleges in New York (state)